The Feminist Women's Health Center of Atlanta is a feminist health center that provides comprehensive gynecological health care, engages in community outreach, and advocates for reproductive justice. Kwajelyn Jackson has been executive director since 2018.

History

The Feminist Women's Health Center (FWHC) was founded in 1977. Like many other feminist health centers, the Atlanta FWHC was born out of self-help groups where women learned to examine their own cervixes.

Today, the Atlanta Feminist Women's Health Center is one of several extant feminist health centers.

Early member of Federation of Feminist Women's Health Centers 
The Atlanta Feminist Women's Health Center was a member clinic of the Federation of Feminist Women's Health Centers (FFWHC). The Federation of Feminist Women's Health Centers originated in Los Angeles, and subsequently member clinics opened throughout California and eventually other parts of the country, including Tallahassee, Florida and Atlanta, Georgia. Women's health movement historian Sandra Morgen notes, "Until the National Black Women's Health Project… in the 1980s, the FFWHC was the only multiple-site group in the larger women's health movement." All member clinics provided abortion and gynecological health care, and worked together to "espouse a unified ideology and identifiable politics."

The FFWHC member clinics stood out from others in the women's health movement because they adopted a more hierarchal model when other feminist clinics were operating as collectives. The debate and dispute over the FFWHC's mode of operation reached a point where some women's health centers refused to refer clients to FFWHC clinics for abortions. In 1990, Carol Downer, founder of the Los Angeles FWHC and leader in the women's health movement, responded to the controversy, "Most of the criticisms I've heard revolve around hierarchy… I might say it was the difference between being organized and disorganized… It's hard for me to understand why anyone who goes into a political arena doesn't want to be as organized as they can possibly be… if you really are serious about what you are doing. Because otherwise you are the mercy of these larger forces which are organized."

A few years after moving their headquarters to Eugene, Oregon, the costs of operating the FFWHC offices proved too expensive. Although the member clinics stay in touch, they are no longer formally connected as a federation. However, most of these clinics, including the Atlanta FWHC, are now part of a new consortium of women's health care providers, the Feminist Abortion Network.

Health services

The Feminist Women's Health Center offers a variety of sexual and reproductive health care programs, many of which are designed to reach historically underserved populations within the Atlanta community. In addition to providing comprehensive gynecological services, the center was also a leader in offerings trans health services and donor insemination.

Abortion 
FWHC provides both surgical and medication abortions in their Atlanta clinic. In 2017 and 2018, FWHC performed abortions on 3,867 patients, including patients surviving trauma and dealing with fetal anomalies.

Sexual health and wellness 
FWHC offers affordable annual wellness exams, pregnancy testing, miscarriage care, birth control and emergency contraception options, sexually transmitted infection screening and treatment, and HIV testing and counseling. In 2017 and 2018, FWHC provided these services to 1,074 patients.

Trans Health Initiative

The Feminist Women's Health Center began offering health services to transmasculine individuals in 2000. The Trans Health Initiative was founded in the memory of Robert Eads, a partially transitioned trans man who died of ovarian cancer at the age of 53 after being denied medical care.

The Feminist Women's Health Center first offered low-cost gynecological services to trans men at the annual Southern Comfort Conference, and continues to offer services at the conference as the Robert Eads Clinic. The clinic saw more and more patients each year, and in June 2008, the FWHC began offering services to trans men year-round through the Trans Health Initiative.

The Trans Health Initiative serves clients throughout the Southeast. Many of the clinic's clients have traveled across state lines because there is no trans-friendly health care provider in their own state. In addition to providing their clients with non-judgmental health care, the Trans Health Initiative also works to educate the medical community about transgender health.

Donor insemination

The donor insemination program began at the Feminist Women's Health Center in 1988. The program began because most infertility specialists in the southern United States were only willing to offer their services to married women, leaving single heterosexual women and lesbians unable to access fertility treatments. When the FWHC began offering its donor insemination services, it was only one of about a dozen clinics in the entire country to offer these services. In a 1990 profile of the program, an employee of the center noted that only about 5% of the women seeking donor insemination were married, and about a third of the program's clients were lesbians. In 2012, about 90% of clients identified as lesbians.

In 2014, with fertility services and clinics more widely available, FWHC ended the donor insemination program to refocus efforts and resources on other services.

Legislative advocacy 
Feminist Women's Health Center has formally advocated for legal access to abortion and healthcare at the local and state level for more than 20 years. FWHC engages a full-time lobbyist at the state Capitol, mobilizes community members for action alerts, coordinates advocacy days where volunteers can learn about the politics of reproductive justice and lobby their state legislators, and educates on laws relevant to reproductive justice and legislative process, including voter engagement.

Lawsuit challenging Georgia abortion ban 
During the 2019-2020 legislative session, the Georgia House and Senate passed House Bill 481 (HB 481), a six-week abortion ban and one of the most restrictive anti-abortion measures in the United States. In May 2019,  Governor Brian Kemp signed HB 481 to go into effect January 1, 2020. 

That June, Feminist Women's Health Center partnered with the American Civil Liberties Union, Center for Reproductive Rights, Planned Parenthood and other reproductive justice organizations to file SisterSong v. Kemp in the United States District Court for the Northern District of Georgia to challenge the constitutionality of the ban. Judge Steve C. Jones ruled in favor of the plaintiffs, granting an injunction preventing the ban from being enforced in January 2020, as the case continues to move through the courts.

Walk in My Shoes, Hear Our Voice 
On March 12, 2012, the Feminist Women's Health Center organized a protest at the Georgia State Capitol, along with a wide range coalition partners that included ACLU – Georgia and SisterSong Reproductive Justice Collective. The protest was in response to a spate of legislation that would restrict Georgia women's access to reproductive health care, ranging from religious exemptions for birth control coverage to a twenty-week abortion ban. Over five hundred people showed up to the protest, which was organized around the principles that women have a right to:

 Determine when and whether to have children
 Have a healthy pregnancy and birth
 Become a parent and parent with dignity
 Have safe and healthy relationships and families

Community engagement

Like other feminist health centers, Feminist Women's Health Center recognizes that access to health care is closely linked with politics and other social factors. As a result, FWHC has a community engagement and advocacy department in addition to providing health care at their clinic. FWHC's community engagement has transpired through a variety of programs designed to serve specific populations, including Black women, refugees, queer women, men, and young leaders. Today, the clinic engages volunteers and hosts a reproductive justice book club, in addition to key programs, the Lifting Latinx Voices initiative and the Errin J. Vuley Fellows Program.

The Lifting Latinx Voices Initiative is a health outreach program that strives to empower and educate the Latinx community in addition to addressing health disparities that impact Latinx people. Using the community leadership model of promotores de salud from Latin American countries, the initiative offers open and safe spaces to discuss reproductive health and address specific needs and barriers.

The Errin J. Vuley Fellows Program was launched in 2017 to support community leaders in building skills and knowledge through a reproductive justice framework. Named for FWHC's first community engagement coordinator, the fellowship focuses especially on Vuley's advocacy for abortion access, trans justice and racial justice. Through monthly workshops and retreats, fellows learn from each other and community organizations, setting them up for futures in movement work.

See also
Black Women's Health Imperative, formerly the National Black Women's Health Project

References

Medical and health organizations based in Georgia (U.S. state)
Feminist organizations in the United States
Abortion-rights organizations in the United States
Women in Georgia (U.S. state)
Health centers
Clinics in the United States